The Karoliina Rantamäki Award is an ice hockey trophy awarded by the Finnish Ice Hockey Association to the playoff MVP of the Naisten Liiga, called the Naisten SM-sarja during 1982 to 2017. The Naisten SM-sarja Playoff MVP trophy was first awarded in the 1999–2000 season and the first recipient was forward Kati Kovalainen of Espoo Blues Naiset.

The most Karoliina Rantamäki Awards won by a single player is three, a record fittingly held by HIFK Naiset captain Karoliina Rantamäki. Rantamäki was recognized as the Naisten SM-sarja Playoff MVP in 2001, 2005, and 2007, all while playing with the Espoo Blues. The award was named after Rantamäki in the 2010–11 season. Of the ten players with Naisten Liiga trophies named in their honor, Rantamäki is the only player to hold the most wins of her eponymous award; she also holds the record for most Marianne Ihalainen Awards, with six, and most Tiia Reima Awards, with eight.

The Karoliina Rantamäki Award correlates with post-retirement coaching positions more than any other Naisten Liiga award; of the eight retired players who won the award during their playing careers, six have held or currently hold coaching positions: Maija Hassinen-Sullanmaa (2006), Sanna Lankosaari (2002), Linda Leppänen (2010, 2014), Isabella Laiho (2015) in the Naisten Liiga, Riikka Sallinen (previously Välilä; 2016) in the Swedish Women's Hockey League (SDHL), and Mira Jalosuo (2017) with the Professional Women's Hockey Players Association (PWHPA).

Award winners 

Source: , Elite Prospects

All time award recipients

References

Naisten Liiga (ice hockey) trophies and awards
Most valuable player awards